Pierre Welté Whalon (born November 12, 1952) is a retired American bishop. He was the bishop in charge of the Convocation of Episcopal Churches in Europe until April 2019. He was consecrated as a bishop on November 18, 2001. He was born in Newport, Rhode Island. He has been a guest columnist for Anglicans Online.

See also 
List of bishops of the Episcopal Church in the United States of America

References

External links 
Personal website

Living people
1952 births
People from Newport, Rhode Island
Bishops of the Convocation of Episcopal Churches in Europe